Hold 'Em Yale is a 1935 American comedy film directed by Sidney Lanfield and written by Damon Runyon, Paul Gerard Smith, and Eddie Welch. The film stars Patricia Ellis, Cesar Romero, Buster Crabbe, William Frawley, Andy Devine, and George Barbier; it was released on April 27, 1935, by Paramount Pictures.

Plot

A racketeer known as "Sunshine Joe" specializes in ticket scalping. His gang of colorfully nicknamed thugs includes Liverlips, Sam the Gonoph, and Bennie South Street, as well as Georgie the Chaser, who was dubbed that because of his penchant for chasing after women.

On a train, Georgie happens upon Clarice Van Cleve, an heiress who loves to fall in love, particularly with men in uniform. This has created many a headache for her father, who already has seen Clarice elope three times with military types, each ending badly.

Mr. Van Cleve diverts his daughter to a New Jersey health resort, where he introduces her to his friend Mr. Wilmot and handsome son Hector, in the hope that Clarice and Hector will hit it off. Georgie the gigolo still has Clarice's eye, however, pretending to be a combat pilot. When Clarice turns up and begins acting like a homemaker, though, driving him crazy, Georgie, learning she has been disinherited by her dad, leaves by claiming he is needed by "the King" to fly a mission.

Sunshine Joe runs off with money earned from scalped tickets to the Harvard–Yale college football game. As Hector is a member of the Yale team, all of Joe's goons travel to New Haven, Connecticut, for the game and place bets. Shocked to find Hector is a benchwarmer, they intimidate the coach with a gun and demand that Hector be permitted to play. He kicks a field goal to win the game, which results in him, a man in another kind of uniform, in the arms of Clarice.

Cast 
Patricia Ellis as Clarice Van Cleve
Cesar Romero as Gigolo Georgie
Buster Crabbe as Hector Wilmot 
William Frawley as Sunshine Joe
Andy Devine as Liverlips
George Barbier as Mr. Van Cleve
Warren Hymer as Sam The Gonoph
George E. Stone as Bennie South Street
Hale Hamilton as Mr. Wilmot
Guy Usher as Coach Jennings

References

External links 
 

1935 films
1930s English-language films
Paramount Pictures films
American comedy films
1935 comedy films
Films directed by Sidney Lanfield
American black-and-white films
American football films
1930s American films